WSAU-FM (99.9 MHz) is a radio station  broadcasting a conservative news/talk format, simulcasting WSAU in Wausau. Licensed to Rudolph, Wisconsin, United States, the station serves the Stevens Point-Wisconsin Rapids area.  The station is currently owned by Midwest Communications. WSAU derives a large amount of its programming from nationally syndicated conservative talk radio shows, and also broadcasts sports, such as from the Packers Radio Network.

History
WSAU-FM was previously known as WIZD and had a history of simulcasting WOFM in Wausau under various oldies, classic hits and adult contemporary formats since the 1990s. On September 9, 2009 at 5AM, WIZD dropped the WOFM simulcast (doing so in the middle of the song "Burning Down the House" by Talking Heads) and began simulcasting sister news station WSAU (AM) under new calls WSAU-FM.

History of call letters
The call letters WSAU-FM were previously assigned to a Wausau station (now WIFC) that began broadcasting August 29, 1948. It broadcast on 95.5 MHz and was licensed to The Milwaukee Journal.

References

External links

SAU-FM
Midwest Communications radio stations
News and talk radio stations in the United States
Radio stations established in 1990
1990 establishments in Wisconsin